Amphicerus cornutus is a horned powderpost beetle species in the genus Amphicerus.

References

Bostrichidae
Beetles described in 1772
Taxa named by Peter Simon Pallas